Eilema signata is a moth of the subfamily Arctiinae first described by Francis Walker in 1854. It is found in northern China.

References

signata
Moths described in 1854